Philip Kreiner (born 1950 in Timmins, Ontario) is a Canadian writer, whose short story collection People Like Us in a Place Like This was a nominee for the Governor General's Award for English-language fiction at the 1983 Governor General's Awards.

He published two further novels, Heartlands and Contact Prints, in the 1980s. All three works were drawn from Kreiner's own experience as a teacher who had worked in Cree communities in far Northern Ontario and in Jamaica.

Works
People Like Us in a Place Like This (1983)
Heartlands (1984)
Contact Prints (1987)

References

1950 births
Living people
Canadian male novelists
20th-century Canadian novelists
Canadian male short story writers
Writers from Timmins
20th-century Canadian short story writers
20th-century Canadian male writers